The 2019 World Para Powerlifting Championships was a competition for male and female athletes with a disability. It was held in Nur-Sultan, Kazakhstan and ran from 12 to 20 July.

The tournament was one of the compulsory tournaments to qualify for the 2020 Summer Paralympics held in Tokyo, Japan.

Medal table

Medalists

Men

Women

Mixed

Results

Men

49 kg

54 Kg

59 Kg

65 Kg

72 Kg

80 Kg

88 Kg

97 Kg

107 Kg

+107 Kg

Women

41 Kg

45 Kg

50 Kg

55 Kg

61 Kg

67 Kg

73 Kg

79 Kg

86 Kg

+86 Kg

References

External links
 Official website
 Results

World Para Powerlifting Championships
2019 in weightlifting
World Para Powerlifting Championships
World Para Powerlifting Championships
Sport in Astana
World Para Powerlifting Championships